The Pusta or Puszta is a Hungarian traditional landscape.

Pusta or Puszta may also refer to:
 Hortobágy National Park or the Puszta, a UNESCO World Heritage Site in Hungary
 Pusta, a village in Şincai Commune, Mureș County, Romania
 Pusta, a village in Șimleu Silvaniei, Sălaj County,  Romania